The  are a mountain range to the west of Lake Biwa on the border of Shiga Prefecture and Kyoto Prefecture, Japan. The eastern side of the Hira Mountains looks steeply over Lake Biwa, while the western side of the range forms a gentler valley in Kyoto.

The spring snow of the Hira Mountains is one of the Eight Views of Ōmi.

Hira-oroshi
A strong local wind  often blows from Hira Mountains to Lake Biwa especially in the late days of the March. The wind sometimes sinks boats on the lake and stops trains of the Kosei Line, a JR line passing along the foot of the mountains. In every 26 March, Tendai priests hold a memorial service for casualties of shipwreck accidents.

Recreation
The Hira Mountains are a popular destination for skiing, hiking, and mountain climbing.

References

Mountain ranges of Shiga Prefecture
Mountain ranges of Kyoto Prefecture